Ruslan Spartakovich Gogniyev (born 27 July 2002) is a Russian football player. He plays for FC Alania Vladikavkaz.

Club career
He made his debut in the Russian Football National League for FC Alania Vladikavkaz on 28 April 2021 in a game against FC Krasnodar-2.

Personal life
His father Spartak Gogniyev is a football coach and former player.

References

External links
 
 Profile by Russian Football National League

2002 births
Living people
Russian footballers
Association football forwards
FC Spartak Vladikavkaz players
Russian First League players
Russian Second League players